Kennersley is a historic home located at Church Hill, Queen Anne's County, Maryland. It is a large five-part brick house believed to date to the last quarter of the 18th century. The central block is approximately 35 feet square, two and a half stories high, with the pitched gable roof. Flanking one-story hyphens connect the central block with a pair of flanking -story wings. The house was constructed between 1785 and 1798.

Kennersley was listed on the National Register of Historic Places in 1983.

References

External links
, including photo from 1968, at Maryland Historical Trust

Houses on the National Register of Historic Places in Maryland
Houses in Queen Anne's County, Maryland
Houses completed in 1785
National Register of Historic Places in Queen Anne's County, Maryland